Martin Jesse Klein (June 25, 1924 – March 28, 2009), usually cited as M. J. Klein, was a science historian of 19th and 20th century physics.

Biography
Klein was born in the Bronx, New York City. He was an only child and both his parents were schoolteachers. After graduating from James Monroe High School at the age of 14, he attended Columbia University, where he received a bachelor's degree in mathematics in 1942 and a master's degree in physics in 1944. In 1948, he received a Ph.D. in physics under László Tisza at the Massachusetts Institute of Technology.

From 1949 to 1966, Klein was a member of the staff of the physics department of Cleveland's Case Institute of Technology, starting as an instructor and becoming a full professor in 1960. Throughout the 1950s, he became more interested in the history of physics. During this time, Klein contributed to the Theoretical Physics Department at the Dublin Institute for Advanced Studies. During the academic year 1958–1959 he was a Guggenheim Fellow at the Lorentz Institute of the University of Leiden. He joined Yale University's Department of the History of Science and Medicine in 1967 and in 1971 became the chair of the department. In 1977, due to fiscal concerns, Yale University eliminated the department and Klein became a professor in the physics department, where he remained until his retirement.

From 1963 to 1979, Klein wrote 20 articles devoted exclusively to Einstein's work. From 1988 to 1998, he was the editor-in-chief of The Collected Papers of Albert Einstein under the aegis of Princeton University Press. The Einstein Papers Project started in the mid-1970s and published 2 volumes before Klein took over. He led the team that produced volumes 3 through 6, covering Einstein's papers from 1909 through 1917.
 
At Yale University, he was the Eugene Higgins emeritus professor of the history of physics and an emeritus professor of physics. He was elected to the Académie Internationale d'Histoire des Sciences (1971), the National Academy of Sciences (1977) and the American Academy of Arts and Sciences (1979).

In 2005 Klein was the first recipient of the Abraham Pais Prize for History of Physics, a joint award of the American Physical Society and the American Institute of Physics. His doctoral students include Russell McCormmach.

He died in Chapel Hill, North Carolina.

Publications
Author
 1970:  Paul Ehrenfest: The Making of a Theoretical Physicist.  Biography of Paul Ehrenfest.  Amsterdam: Elsevier.  . 1985 edition: 
 1993:  Physicists' Inaugural Lectures in History.  Amsterdam University Press.  .

Editor
 1993-1996: Einstein Papers Project.  Lead editor, Volumes 3 , 4, 5; editor, Volume 6,  The Collected Papers of Albert Einstein. Princeton University Press:
 Volume 3: The Swiss Years: Writings, 1909 - 1911. Editors: Martin J. Klein, A. J. Kox, Jürgen Renn, Robert Schulmann
 Volume 4: The Swiss Years: Writings, 1912 - 1914. Editors: Martin J. Klein, A. J. Kox, Jürgen Renn, Robert Schulmann
 Volume 5: The Swiss Years: Correspondence, 1902 - 1914. Editors: Martin J. Klein, A. J. Kox, Robert Schulmann
 Volume 6: The Berlin Years: Writings, 1914 - 1917. Editors: A. J. Kox, Martin J. Klein, Robert Schulmann

Subject
 1995:  A. J. Kox and Daniel M. Siegel, No Truth Except in the Details: Essays in Honor of Martin J. Klein. Kluwer Academic Publishers. .

References

Other sources
 Academic biography in Pais Prize announcement, AIP Center for History of Physics Newsletter, Volume XXXVII, No. 2, Fall 2005.
 Einstein Papers Project and past editors.
 Martin J. Klein Papers (MS 1866). Manuscripts and Archives, Yale University Library.

1924 births
2009 deaths
20th-century American historians
20th-century American male writers
American historians of science
Yale University faculty
Members of the United States National Academy of Sciences
Fellows of the American Academy of Arts and Sciences
Columbia College (New York) alumni
MIT Department of Physics alumni
Case Western Reserve University faculty
People from the Bronx
Historians from New York (state)
James Monroe High School (New York City) alumni
American male non-fiction writers
Academics of the Dublin Institute for Advanced Studies